The year 2021 was the 6th year in the history of the Brave Combat Federation, a mixed martial arts promotion based in Bahrain.

Brave CF Flyweight Tournament

Background 
Brave Combat Federation will look to crown its first Flyweight world champion with an 8-man tournament.

The eight participants of the tournament were revealed. They included the former Bantamweight World Champion Zach Makovsky, the formers UFC fighter Dustin Ortiz, Ali Bagautinov, Jose Torres as well as Abdul Hussein, Flavio de Queiroz, Velimurad Alkhasov and the former Cage Fury Flyweight Champion Sean Santella.

BRAVE CF Flyweight Tournament bracket 

1Zach Makovsky got a Quarterfinal bye as Abdul Hussein pulled out due to illness during the weightcut.

2First bout between Torres and Sean Santella ended in a draw at Brave CF 42; Santella was replaced for the rematch by Blaine O’Driscoll due to injury and the bout was held at the Catchweight of 61 kg 

3Torres pulled out due to weight cut difficulties and was replaced by Sean Santella

Brave CF 46: Krepost Selection 10

Brave CF 46: Krepost Selection 10 was a mixed martial arts event held by Brave Combat Federation in partnership with Krepost FC on January 16, 2021, at the WOW Arena in Sochi, Russia.

Background
The event was headlined by a Super Lightweight title bout between the reigning Brave Super Lightweight champion Eldar Eldarov and the former UFC lightweight Leonardo Mafra.

In the co-main event, the one-time UFC Flyweight title challenger Ali Bagautinov was scheduled to fight Oleg Lichkovakha in a 59.5 kg catchweight bout.

Results

Brave CF 47: Asian Domination 

Brave CF 47: Asian Domination was a mixed martial arts event held by Brave Combat Federation on March 11, 2021, at the Arad Fort in Arad, Bahrain.

Background 
A lightweight title eliminator between Rolando Dy and Abdysalam Uulu Kubanychiev was scheduled as the main event of the card.

Two undefeated featherweight prospects were scheduled to fight in the co-main event: Tae Kyun Kim and Husein Kadimagomaev.

Nursulton Ruziboev was set to face off against Andreas Stahl, but the Swede was forced to drop out due to injury. Ibrahim Mane will step up on five days’ notice to take on Ruziboev.

Results

Brave CF 48: Arabian Night 

Brave CF 48: Arabian Night was a mixed martial arts event held by Brave Combat Federation on March 18, 2021, at the Arad Fort in Arad, Bahrain.

Background 
The event was headlined by a lightweight bout between two promotional newcomers, the PFL veterant Ylies Djiroun has met the former ACA fighter Abdul-Rakhman Makhazhiev.

Tariq Ismail and Nkosi Ndebele were scheduled to fight at bantamweight, but Ismail was forced off the card due to undisclosed reasons. Ndebele instead faced Abdelmoumen Mssaate, who stepped in on short notice for this encounter.

Results

Brave CF 49: Super Fights 

Brave CF 49: Super Fights  was a mixed martial arts event scheduled to be held by Brave Combat Federation on March 25, 2021, at the Arad Fort in Arad, Bahrain.

Background 
The event was headlined by a fight between Luan Santiago and Benoît Saint-Denis in a super  lightweight bout.

The co-main event featured a rematch between Jose Torres and Sean Santella. The fight is part of the Brave Flyweight Tournament, with their first fight ending in a draw. The week of the event, Santella had to pull out due to injury and was replaced by SBG Ireland's Blaine O’Driscoll. While the fight will be contested at a Catchweight of 61 kg, due to the short-notice nature of the match-up, the bout between Torres and O’Driscoll will indeed serve as a quarter-final fight for the Flyweight tournament.

Two IMMAF flyweight standouts, Muhammad Mokaev and Abdul Hussein, were scheduled to fight at the event.

Results

Brave CF 50 

Brave CF 50 was a mixed martial arts event held by Brave Combat Federation on April 1, 2021, at the Arad Fort in Arad, Bahrain.

Background 
This event featured a title fight between the champion Jarrah Hussein Al-Silawi and the promotional newcomer Ismail Naurdiev for the Brave Welterweight title as the event headliner.

The co-main event was set to feature a fight for the vacant Brave Light Heavyweight title, between the current Brave Middleweight champion Mohammad Fakhreddine and Mohamed Said Maalem. However, on the day of the event, Fakhreddine had to pull out due to illness, the bout was postponed.

Amin Ayoub was scheduled to make the first defense of his Brave Lightweight title, against the 8-fight Brave veteran Ahmed Amir. However, a week before the event, Amir had to pull out due to injury and was replaced by Mashrabjon Ruziboev, who would fight Ayoub in a 74 kg catchweight non-title fight.

The Brave flyweight tournament has continued with a semi-finals bout who has featured a rematch between Velimurad Alkhasov and Zach Makovsky, and a quarter-final bout between two formers UFC flyweights, Ali Bagautinov and Dustin Ortiz.

Results

Brave CF 51: The Future Is Here 

Brave CF 51: The Future Is Here was a mixed martial arts event held by Brave Combat Federation on June 4, 2021, at the Falcon Club in Minsk. Belarus will become the 21st country to host a Brave CF show.

Background 
Former UFC fighter Lucas Martins was scheduled to fight Marcel Grabinski in the main event. Hoewever, Grabinski has to pull out from the fight due to medical condition. The bout has been called off.

In the co-main event Denis Maher was scheduled to fight Giannis Bachar in a welterweight bout, but Bachar has been forced to withdraw due to an injury. Fernando Gonzalez has stepped in as a replacement. Unfortunately, Gonzalez has been forced to pull due to an undisclosed injury. Maher instead faced Rinat Sagyntay, who stepped in on 3 weeks notice for this encounter.

Frenchmen Ylies Djiroun fought the brit Sam Patterson in lightweight bout. One-time UFC fighter Roman Bogatov fought Abdulmutalip Gairbekov in a featherweight bout.

Results

Brave CF 52: Bad Blood

Brave CF 52: Bad Blood was a mixed martial arts event held by Brave Combat Federation in partnership with The Golden Cage promotion on August 1, 2021, in Milan, Italy. Italy will become the 22nd country to host a Brave CF show.

Background
Brave middleweight champion Mohammad Fakhreddine faced Mohamed Said Maalem for the vacant BRAVE Light Heavyweight title. The two of them were scheduled to fight at Brave CF 50, before Fakhreddine withdrew due to illness. Mohamed Said Maalem was strip of the title by FIGMMA for intentional punches opponent's back of the head.

Two additions to the card were announced on July 1: A middleweight bout between Enrico Cortese and the 2015 ADCC bronze medalist Rustam Chsiev, as well as a featherweight bout between the former featherweight champion Elias Boudegzdame and the promotional newcomer Declan Dalton.

The five-fight Brave veteran Gamzat Magomedov is scheduled to meet the undefeated Mochamed Machaev in a bantamweight bout.

Promotional newcomer Olli Santalahti was scheduled to fight the three-fight Brave veteran Kevin Ruart in a super-welterweight bout.

Abdoul Abdouraguimov was scheduled to face Nursulton Ruziboev in an 81 kg catchweight bout.

A featherweight bout between Husein Kadimagomaev and Agshin Babaev was announced for the event, after both fighters had called each other out though social media.

Results

Brave CF 53

Brave CF 53 was a mixed martial arts event held by Brave Combat Federation in partnership with the Octagon League promotion on August 21, 2021, in Almaty, Kazakhstan.

Background
A lightweight bout between Lucas Martins and Marcel Grabinski was announced for the event. The two were originally scheduled to fight at Brave CF 51, before Grabinski withdrew from the bout due to health issues. According to Brave CF officials, Grabinski was forced to withdraw from the rescheduled bout a little bit less than week prior to the event due to COVID-19 protocols. Marcel hasn't traveled to Kazakhstan and will be replaced by local standout Olzhas Eskaraev.

A bantamweight bout between UFC veteran Brad Katona and Bair Shtepin was scheduled as the co-main event.

Nurzhan Akishev was scheduled to face the undefeated Tae Kyun Kim in a featherweight bout.

Results

Brave CF 54

Brave CF 54 was a mixed martial arts event held by Brave Combat Federation in partnership with Galana Group on September 25, 2021, in Konin, Poland. Poland will become the 23rd country to host a Brave CF show.

Background
A Brave Lightweight Championships title bout between the reigning champion Amin Ayoub and challenger Ahmed Amir was scheduled as the event headliner.

A super lightweight bout between Marcel Grabinski and Mihail Kotruţă was scheduled as the co-main event.

Results

Brave CF 55

Brave CF 55 was a mixed martial arts event held by Brave Combat Federation in partnership with Pro FC on November 6, 2021, in Rostov-on-Don, Russia.

Background
A Brave flyweight tournament semifinal bout between Ali Bagautinov and José Torres was announced for the event. However, due to difficulties making weight, Torres pulled out and was replaced by Sean Santella.

Results

Brave CF 56

Brave CF 56 was a mixed martial arts event held by Brave Combat Federation in partnership with MMA League of Serbia on December 18, 2021, in Belgrade, Serbia. Serbia will become the 24th country to host a Brave CF show.

Background
A middleweight bout between Chad Hanekom and Miro Jurković was slated to serve as the event co-headliner. However, on December 12, Hanekom have to withdraw for this event due to travel restrictions. Mikhail Allakhverdian step in on short notice to face Jurković in the co-main event.

Results

See also 

 List of current Brave CF fighters
 List of current mixed martial arts champions

References 

Brave Combat Federation
Brave Combat Federation
Brave Combat Federation